Hummay (Umme, Houmé or Hume) was the first Muslim king, mai, of the Sefuwa dynasty within Kanem-Bornu Empire from 1085 to 1097, replacing the Sefuwa-Duguwa dynasty. 

The dynasty founded by him was to survive until 1846. His rule had important consequences because of the spread of Islam during his reign. This provoked some dissension, causing the Zaghawa to break from the empire and move east.

See also
Kanem Empire
Sayfawa dynasty

References

Further reading
Barkindo, Bawuro, "The early states of the Central Sudan: Kanem, Borno and some of their neighbours to c. 1500 A.D.", in: J. Ajayi und M. Crowder (ed.), History of West Africa, vol. I, 3. ed. Harlow 1985, 225-254.
Lange, Dierk: "The Chad region as a crossroads", in: M. El Fasi (ed.), General History of Africa, vol. III, UNESCO, London 1988, p. 436-460.
Palmer, Richmond: The Bornu Sahara and Sudan, London 1936 (English translation of the Dīwān, pp. 89–95).

Rulers of the Kanem Empire
11th-century monarchs in Africa